Trinidad and Tobago literature has its roots in oral storytelling among African slaves, the European literary roots of the French creoles and in the religious and folk tales of the Indian indentured immigrants.  It blossomed in the 20th century with the writings of C. L. R. James, V. S. Naipaul and Saint Lucian-born Derek Walcott as part of the growth of West Indian literature.

Origins
One of the earliest works in the Anglophone Caribbean literature was Jean-Baptiste Philippe's 1824 work, Free Mulatto. Michel Maxwell Philip's 1854 work, Emmanuel Appadocca: A Tale of the Boucaneers, is considered the country's first novel.

Notable writers

See also
 West Indian literature

References

External links 
 Selwyn Cudjoe, "Literature and National Development", trinicenter.com, 21 June 2004.
 Selwyn Cudjoe, "Identity and Caribbean Literature", trinicenter.com, 24 June 2001.
 Selwyn Ryan, "Beyond native boundaries", Trinidad Express

 
North American literature